This articles is a list of American football players who have played for the Atlanta Falcons in the National Football League (NFL). It includes players that have played at least one game in the NFL regular season. The Falcons have appeared in Super Bowl XXXIII and Super Bowl LI, losing both games.



A

 John Abraham (DE), South Carolina . . . . 2006-12
 Dick Absher (LB), Maryland . . . . 1967–68
 Ron Acks (LB), Illinois . . . . 1968–71
 Bob Adams (TE), Pacific . . . . 1976
 Brent Adams (T), U of Tenn at Chattanooga . . . . 1975–78
 Scott Adams (G/T), Georgia . . . . 1997
 Spencer Adkins (LB), Miami (Fla.) . . . . 2009-11
 Mel Agee (DL), Illinois . . . . 1992–95
 Jeremy Akers (T), Notre Dame . . . . 1997
 Keith Alex (G), Texas A&M . . . . 1993
 Harold Alexander (P), Appalachian St . . . . 1993–94
 Robert Alford (CB), Southeast Louisiana . . . . 2013-2014
 Anthony Allen (WR), Washington . . . . 1985–86
 Demetrius Allen (WR), Virginia . . . . 1996
 Grady Allen (LB), Texas A&M . . . . 1969–72
 Ricardo Allen (CB), Purdue . . . . 2014
 P. J. Alexander (G), Syracuse . . . . 2006
 Ashley Ambrose (CB), Miss. Valley St . . . . 2000–02
 Morten Andersen (K), Mich. St . . . . 1995–00, 06-07
 Anthony Anderson (RB), Temple . . . . 1980
 Courtney Anderson (TE), San Jose State . . . . 2007
 Darren Anderson (CB), Toledo . . . . 1998
 Dunstan Anderson (DL), Tulsa . . . . 1994
 Jamaal Anderson (DE), Arkansas . . . . 2007-10
 Jamal Anderson (RB), Utah . . . . 1994–01
 Taz Anderson (TE), Georgia Tech . . . . 1966–67
 Tim Anderson (DT), Ohio State . . . . 2007
 William Andrews (RB), Auburn . . . . 1979–83, 86
 Lester Archambeau (DE), Stanford . . . . 1993–99
 David Archer (QB), Iowa St . . . . 1984–87
 Javier Arenas (CB), Alabama . . . . 2014
 Jon Asamoah (G), Illinois . . . . 2014
 Corey Atkins (LB), South Carolina . . . . 2000
 Joe Auer (RB), Georgia Tech . . . . 1968
 Cliff Austin (RB), Clemson . . . . 1984–86

B

 Jonathan Babineaux (DT), Iowa . . . . 2005-14
 Rick Badanjek (RB), Maryland . . . . 1987–88
 Jim Bailey (DT), Kansas . . . . 1976–78
 Larry Bailey (DT), Pacific . . . . 1974
 Stacey Bailey (WR), San Jose St . . . . 1982–90
 Eugene Baker (WR), Kent . . . . 1999–00
 Sam Baker (OT), USC . . . . 2008-14
 Sean Baker (S) Ball State . . . . 2013-2014
 Tony Baker (RB), East Carolina . . . . 1986
 Robert Baldwin (RB), Duke . . . . 1996
 Chris Banks (G), Kansas . . . . 2000–01
 Gary Barnes (WR), Clemson . . . . 1966–67
 Lew Barnes (WR, KR), Oregon . . . . 1988
 Doug Barnett (C) Azusa Pacific . . . . 1987
 Oliver Barnett (DT), Kentucky . . . . 1990–92
 Steve Bartkowski (QB), California . . . . 1975–85
 Joplo Bartu (LB), Texas State . . . . 2013-2014
 Patrick Bates (S), Texas A&M . . . . 1996
 D'Anthony Batiste (OL), Louis.-Lafayette . . . . 2007
 Chris Bayne (S), Fresno State . . . . 1997–98
 Bubba Bean (RB), Texas A&M . . . . 1976–80
 Aaron Beasley (CB), West Virginia . . . . 2004
 Nick Bebout (T), Wyoming . . . . 1973–75
 Jordan Beck (LB), Cal Poly . . . . 2006
 Brad Beckman (TE), Nebraska–Omaha . . . . 1989
 Bill Bell (PK), Kansas . . . . 1971–72
 Kerwin Bell (QB), Florida . . . . 1988
 Willie Belton (RB), Maryland St . . . . 1971–72
 Dan Benish (DT), Clemson . . . . 1983–86
 Cornelius Bennett (LB), Alabama . . . . 1996–98
 Cliff Benson (TE), Purdue . . . . 1984–85
 Duane Benson (LB), Hamline . . . . 1972–73
 Thomas Benson (LB), Oklahoma . . . . 1984–85
 Scott Bentley (K), Florida State . . . . 1997
 Troy Bergeron (WR), No college . . . . 2009
 Bob Berry (QB), Oregon . . . . 1968–72
 Eric Beverly (TE), Miami (Ohio) . . . . 2004–06
 Martin Bibla (G), Miami . . . . 2002–04
 Kroy Biermann (DE), Montana . . . . 2008-14
 Guy Bingham (C/G), Montana . . . . 1989–91
 J. J. Birden (WR), Oregon . . . . 1995–96
 Brandon Bishop (S), N.C. St. . . . . 2014
 Greg Bishop (G), Pacific . . . . 1999
 Dwayne Blakley (TE), Missouri . . . . 2004–07
 Justin Blalock (OG), Texas . . . . 2007-14
 Tom Bleick (S), Georgia Tech . . . . 1967
 Juran Bolden (CB), Mississippi Delta . . . . 96–98, 02–03
 Michael Boley (LB), Southern Miss . . . . 2005–08
 Marty Booker (WR), Louisiana-Monroe . . . . 2009
 Michael Booker (CB), Nebraska . . . . 1997–99
 Chris Bordano (LB), SMU . . . . 2000  
 Matt Bosher (P), Miami (Fla.) . . . . 2011-14
 Bruce Bosley (G), W Virginia . . . . 1969
 Tony Bowick (NT), UT/Chattanooga . . . . 1989
 Andy Bowling (LB), Virginia Tech . . . . 1967
 Sean Boyd (S), North Carolina . . . . 1996
 Ronnie Bradford (CB/S), Colorado . . . . 1997–01
 Casey Bramlet (QB), Wyoming . . . . 2007
 John Bramlett (LB), Memphis St . . . . 1971
 David Brandon (LB), Memphis State . . . . 1996–97
 Bob Breitenstein (G/T), Tulsa . . . . 1969–70
 Walt Brett (G), Montana . . . . 1976
 Sean Brewer (TE), San Jose State . . . . 2003
 Greg Brezina (LB), Houston . . . . 1968–69, 71–79
 James Britt (DB), LSU . . . . 1983–87
 Eric Brock (S), Auburn . . . . 2008-09
 Keith Brooking (LB), Georgia Tech . . . . 1998–08
 Ethan Brooks (DT/OL), Williams College . . . . 1996
 Jon Brooks (LB), Clemson . . . . 1980
 Steve Broussard (RB), Washington St . . . . 1990–93
 Aaron Brown (LB), Ohio State . . . . 1986–87
 Charlie Brown (WR), SC State . . . . 1985–87
 Clay Brown (TE), Brigham Young . . . . 1982
 Greg Brown (DE), Kansas State . . . . 1987–88
 Omar Brown (S), North Carolina . . . . 1998–99
 Ray Brown (S), W Texas State . . . . 1971–78
 Reggie Brown (RB), Oregon . . . . 1982
 Shannon Brown (DT), Alabama . . . . 1996
 Tyrone Brown (WR), Toledo . . . . 1995–96
 Aundray Bruce (LB), Auburn . . . . 1988–91
 Rob Bruggeman (OL), Iowa . . . . 2011
 Mike Brunson (WR/RB), Arizona St . . . . 1970
 Rick Bryan (DT), Oklahoma . . . . 1984–92
 Charlie Bryant (RB), Allen . . . . 1969
 Matt Bryant (K), Baylor . . . . 2009-14
 Romby Bryant (WR), Tulsa . . . . 1969
 Warren Bryant (T), Kentucky . . . . 1977–84
 Ray Buchanan (CB), Louisville . . . . 1997–03
 Marcus Buckley (LB), Texas A&M . . . . 2000
 Vern Burke (WR), Oregon St. . . . . 1966
 Gary Burley (DT), Pittsburgh . . . . 1984
 John Burrough (DT), Wyoming . . . . 1995–98
 Ken Burrow (WR), San Diego St. . . . . 1971–75
 Jimmy Burson (CB/S), Auburn . . . . 1968
 Devin Bush (S), Florida State . . . . 1995–98
 Rafael Bush (S), South Carolina St. . . . . 2010
 Bobby Butler (CB), FSU . . . . 1981–92
 Jim Butler (RB), Edward Waters . . . . 1968–71
 Rick Byas (DB), Wayne St. . . . . 1974–80

C

 Brian Cabral (LB), Colorado . . . . 1979
 Dave Cahill (DT), Northern Arizona . . . . 1969
 Lynn Cain . . . . 1979–84
 Lee Calland (CB), Louisville . . . . 1966–68
 Chris Calloway (WR), Michigan . . . . 1999
 Reggie Camp (DE), California . . . . 1988
 Scott Campbell (QB), Purdue . . . . 1986–90
 Sonny Campbell (RB), North Arizona . . . . 1970–71
 Gabe Carimi (OL), Wisconsin . . . . 2014
 Keion Carpenter (S), Virginia Tech . . . . 2002–03, 05
 Paul Carrington (DE), Central Fla . . . . 2006
 Marty Carter (S), Mid. Tenn. St. . . . . 1999–01
 Johndale Carty (S), Utah State . . . . 1999–02
 Scott Case (DB), Oklahoma . . . . 1984–94
 Antoine Cash (LB), SMU . . . . 2005
 Chris Cash (CB), USC . . . . 2005
 Rick Cash (DE), NE Missouri . . . . 1968
 Tony Casillas (DT), Oklahoma . . . . 1986–90
 Wendell Cason (DB), Oregon . . . . 1985–87
 Grady Cavness (CB), Texas–EI Paso . . . . 1970
 Mike Cawley (QB), James Madison . . . . 1996
 Joe Cerne (C), Northwestern . . . . 1968
 Pat Chaffey (RB), Oregon St. . . . . 1991
 Kirk Chambers (OL), Stanford . . . . 2011
 Chris Chandler (QB), Washington . . . . 1997–01
 Mike Chapman (G), Texas . . . . 1984
 Darrin Chiaverini (WR), Colorado . . . . 2002
 Henry Childs (TE), Kansas St. . . . . 1974
 Wes Chesson (WR), Duke . . . . 1971–73
 Bob Christian (FB), Northwestern . . . . 1997–02
 Dennis Claridge (QB), Nebraska . . . . 1966
 Travis Claridge (G/T), USC . . . . 2000–03
 Bret Clark (S), Nebraska . . . . 1986–88
 Vinnie Clark (CB), Ohio St. . . . . 1993–94
 Ben Claxton (G), Mississippi . . . . 2005
 Tyson Clabo (G), Wake Forest . . . . 2006-12
 Stan Clayton (T/G), Penn State . . . . 1988–89
 DeAndra Cobb (RB), Michigan State . . . . 2005
 Junior Coffey (RB), Washington . . . . 1966–67,69
 Chase Coffman (TE), Missouri . . . . 2012-13
 Gail Cogdill (WR), Washington St. . . . . 1969–70
 Angelo Coia (WR), USC . . . . 1966
 Erik Coleman (S), Washington State . . . . 2008-09
 Lincoln Coleman (RB), Baylor . . . . 1996
 Rod Coleman (DT), East Carolina . . . . 2004–07
 Calvin Collins (G/C), Texas A&M . . . . 1997–00
 Shawn Collins (WR), N Arizona . . . . 1989–91
 Sonny Collins (RB), Kentucky . . . . 1976
 Glen Condren (DT), Oklahoma . . . . 1969–72
 Kevin Cone (WR), Georgia Tech . . . . 2011-13
 Darion Conner (LB), Jackson State . . . . 1990–93
 Ed Cook (G), Notre Dame . . . . 1966–67
 Evan Cooper (DB), Michigan . . . . 1988–89
 Jim Cope (LB), Ohio . . . . 1976
 Olie Cordill (WR), Memphis St. . . . . 1968
 Chuck Correal (C), Penn St. . . . . 1979–80
 Joe Costello (LB), Central Connecticut . . . . 1986–88
 Ted Cottrell (LB), Delaware Valley . . . . 1969–70
 James Cotton (LB), Ohio State . . . . 2003
 Marcus Cotton (LB), USC . . . . 1988–89
 Terry Cousin (CB), South Carolina . . . . 2000
 Arthur Cox (TE), Tex Southern . . . . 1983–87
 Mike Cox (FB), Georgia Tech . . . . 2011-12
 Chris Crocker (S), Marshall . . . . 2006-07
 Henri Crockett (LB), Florida State . . . . 1997–01
 David Croudip (DB), San Diego State . . . . 1985–88
 Larry Crowe (DB), Tex Southern . . . . 1975
 Alge Crumpler (TE), North Carolina . . . . 2001–07
 Willie Curran (WR), UCLA . . . . 1982–84
 Buddy Curry (LB), North Carolina . . . . 1980–87

D

 Carlton Dabney (DT), Morgan St . . . . 1968
 Harvey Dahl (OG), Nevado-Reno . . . . 2007-10
 Brad Daluiso (K), UCLA . . . . 1991
 Woodrow Dantzler (RB), Clemson . . . . 2003
 Antone Davis (T) Tennessee . . . . 1996–97
 Brad Davis (RB), LSU . . . . 1975
 Chauncey Davis (DE), FSU . . . . 2005–10
 Dominique Davis (QB), East Carolina . . . . 2012-13
 Drew Davis (WR), Oregon . . . . 2012-14
 Greg Davis (K), Citadel . . . . 1987–90
 Mitch Davis (LB), Georgia . . . . 1994
 Nathan Davis (DT), Indiana . . . . 1997
 Paul Davis (LB), North Carolina . . . . 1981–82
 Ron Davis (DB), Tennessee . . . . 1995
 Scott Davis (G), Iowa . . . . 1997
 Tony Daykin (LB), Georgia Tech . . . . 1979–81
 Steve DeBerg (QB), San Jose St . . . . 1998
 Thomas DeCoud (S), California . . . . 2008-13
 Akeem Dent (LB), Georgia . . . . 2011-13
 Tim Denton (CB), Sam Houston St . . . . 1996–97
 Ty Detmer (QB), BYU . . . . 2004–05
 Eric Dickerson (RB), SMU . . . . 1993
 Steve Dils (QB), Stanford . . . . 1988
 Patrick DiMarco (FB), South Carolina . . . . 2013-2014
 Charles Dimry (DB), UNLV . . . . 1988–90
 Howard Dinkins (LB), Florida St . . . . 1992–93
 Corey Dixon (WR), Nebraska . . . . 1994
 Floyd Dixon (WR), Stephen F. Austin . . . . 1986–91
 Rich Dixon (LB), California . . . . 1983
 Al Dodd (WR), NW Louisiana St . . . . 1973–74
 Chris Doleman (DE), Pittsburgh . . . . 1994–95
 Jeff Donaldson (S), Colorado . . . . 1991–93
 Rick Donnelly (P), Wyoming . . . . 1985–88
 Mike Donohoe (TE), U–of–SF . . . . 1968, 1970–71
 Harry Douglas (WR), Louisville . . . . 2008-14
 Gary Downs (RB), N.C. State . . . . 1997–00
 Chris Draft (LB), Stanford . . . . 2000–04
 Shane Dronett (DT), Texas . . . . 1996–02
 T. J. Duckett (RB), Michigan St . . . . 2002–05
 Kevin Dudley (FB), Michigan . . . . 2006
 Dan Dufour (C/G), UCLA . . . . 1983–84
 Steve Duich (G), San Diego St . . . . 1968
 Jamie Dukes (G), Florida State . . . . 1986–93
 Dave Dunaway (WR), Duke . . . . 1968
 LaTarence Dunbar (WR), TCU . . . . 2003
 Jamie Duncan (LB), Vanderbilt . . . . 2004
 Perry Lee Dunn (RB), Mississippi . . . . 1966–68
 Warrick Dunn (RB), Florida St . . . . 2002–07
 Tim Dwight (WR), Iowa . . . . 1998–00

E

 Ron East (DT), Montana St . . . . 1976
 Ray Easterling (S), Richmond . . . . 1972–79
 Irv Eatman (T), UCLA . . . . 1994
 Tracey Eaton (S), Portland St . . . . 1991–93
 Rick Eber (WR), Tulsa . . . . 1968
 Antonio Edwards (DE), Valdosta St . . . . 1998
 Antuan Edwards (S), Clemson . . . . 2005
 Brad Edwards (S), South Carolina . . . . 1994–96
 Ray Edwards (DE), Purdue . . . . 2011
 Terrence Edwards (WR), Georgia . . . . 2003
 Jason Elam (K), Hawaii . . . . 2008-09
 Monroe Eley (RB), Arizona St . . . . 1975–78
 Clarence Ellis (CB), Notre Dame . . . . 1972–74
 Jamin Elliott (WR), Delaware . . . . 2006
 Bert Emanuel (WR), Rice . . . . 1994–97
 Larry Emery (RB), Wisconsin . . . . 1987
 Dick Enderle (G), Minnesota . . . . 1969–71
 R.J. English (WR), Pittsburgh . . . . 2002
 Tory Epps (NT), Memphis State . . . . 1990–92
 Mike Esposito (RB), Boston College . . . . 1976–79
 Bob Etter (K), Georgia . . . . 1968–69
 Major Everett (RB), Mississippi College . . . . 1987
 Bradie Ewing (FB), Wisconsin . . . . 2012-13

F

 Karl Farmer (WR), Pittsburgh . . . . 1976–77
 Jimmy Farris (WR), Montana . . . . 2002–04
 Wilson Faumuina (DT), San Jose St . . . . 1977–81
 Brett Favre (QB), So Miss . . . . 1991
 Jay Feely (K), Michigan . . . . 2001–04
 Jim Ferguson (C), USC . . . . 1969
 Edgar Fields (DT), Texas A&M . . . . 1977–80
 Scott Fields (LB), Southern California . . . . 1996
 Brian Finneran (WR), Villanova . . . . 2000–10
 Joe Fishback (S), Carson–Newman . . . . 1991–92
 Mike Fitzgerald (CB/S), Iowa State . . . . 1967
 Paul Flatley (WR), Northwestern . . . . 1968–69
 Ronald Flemons (DE), Texas A&M . . . . 2001–02
 Kenny Flowers (RB), Clemson . . . . 1987, 1989
 Darryl Ford (LB), New Mexico St . . . . 1994
 Kynan Forney (G), Hawaii . . . . 2001–07
 Roman Fortin (C), San Diego State . . . . 1992–97
 Larry Fortner (WB), Miami–Ohio . . . . 1980
 Renardo Foster (OL), Louisville . . . . 2007
 Jamal Fountaine (LB), Washington . . . . 1997
 Domonique Foxworth (CB), Maryland . . . . 2008
 Reid Fragil (T), Ohio State . . . . 2014
 Bill Fralic (G/T), Pittsburgh . . . . 1985–92
 Wallace Francis (WR), Arkansas AM&N . . . . 1975–81
 George Franklin (RB), Texas A&l . . . . 1978
 Dominique Franks (CB), Oklahoma . . . . 2010-13
 Simon Fraser (DE), Ohio State . . . . 2008
 Devonta Freeman (RB), Florida St . . . . 2014–Present
 Mike Freeman (CB/S), Fresno St . . . . 1968–70
 Ted Fritsch, Jr. (C), St. Norbert . . . . 1972–75
 David Frye (LB), Purdue . . . . 1983–85
 Jamaal Fudge (S), Clemson . . . . 2008-09
 Scott Fulhage (P), Kansas St . . . . 1989–91
 Randy Fuller (CB), Tennessee St . . . . 1998

G

 Bob Gagliano (QB), Utah St. . . . . 1993
 Blane Gaison (S), Hawaii . . . . 1981–84
 Omar Gaither (LB), Tennessee . . . . 2013 
 Frank Gallagher (G), N Carolina . . . . 1973
 Tommy Gallarda (TE), Boise State . . . . 2012 
 Wayne Gandy (T), Auburn . . . . 2006-08
 Mike Gann (DE), Notre Dame . . . . 1985–93
 Derrick Gardner (CB), California . . . . 1999
 Moe Gardner (NT), Illinois . . . . 1991–96
 Roberto Garza (C/G), Tex. A&M Kingsville . . . . 2001–04
 Trevor Gaylor (WR), Miami (Ohio) . . . . 2002
 Jumpy Geathers (DT), Wichita St. . . . . 1993–95
 Jeff George (QB), Illinois . . . . 1994–96
 Ron George (LB), Stanford . . . . 1993–96
 Jim Garcia (DE), Purdue . . . . 1968
 Steve George (DT), Houston . . . . 1976
 Tom Geredine (WR), NE Missouri St. . . . . 1973–74
 Jammi German (WR), Miami . . . . 1998–00
 Willie Germany (S), Morgan St. . . . . 1972
 Ralph Giacomarro (P), Penn State . . . . 1983–85
 Damon Gibson (WR/KR), Iowa . . . . 2002
 Lewis Gilbert (TE), Florida . . . . 1978–79
 Tony Gilbert (LB), Georgia . . . . 2008-09
 John Gilliam (WR), South Carolina St. . . . . 1976
 Paul Gipson (RB), Houston . . . . 1969–70
 Glenn Glass (WR), Tennessee . . . . 1966
 Bob Glazebrook (DB), Fresno St. . . . . 1978–83
 Junior Glymph (DE), Carson–Newman . . . . 2004–05
 Charles Godfrey,  (S), Iowa . . . . 2014
 Willard Goff (DT), W Texas St. . . . . 1985
 Bill Goldberg (NT), Georgia . . . . 1992–94
 Tony Gonzalez (TE), California . . . . 2009-13
 Malliciah Goodman,  (DE), Clemson . . . . 2013-14
 Doug Goodwin (RB), Maryland St. . . . . 1968
 Darrien Gordon (CB/PR), Stanford . . . . 2001
 Dwayne Gordon (LB), New Hampshire . . . . 1993–94
 Tim Gordon (S), Tulsa . . . . 1987–90
 Len Gotshalk (T), Humboldt St. . . . . 1972–76
 Tony Graziani (QB), Oregon . . . . 1997–00
 Harold Green (RB), South Carolina) . . . . 1997–98
 Lamont Green (LB), Florida State . . . . 1999
 Tim Green (LB), Syracuse . . . . 1986–93
 Tiger Greene (DB), Western Carolina . . . . 1985
 Justin Griffith (FB), Mississippi State . . . . 2003–06
 Brent Grimes (CB), Shippensburg . . . . 2007-12
 Dan Grimm (G/C), Colorado . . . . 1966–68
 Harland Gunn (G), Miami . . . . 2012-14

H

 Ra’Shede Hageman (DE), Minnesota . . . . 2014
 Ali Haji–Sheikh (K), Michigan . . . . 1986
 Corey Hall (S), Appalachian State . . . . 2001
 Cory Hall (S), Fresno State . . . . 2003–04
 DeAngelo Hall (CB), Virginia Tech . . . . 2004–07
 Travis Hall (DT), BYU . . . . 1995–03
 Bob Hallen (G/T), Kent State . . . . 1998–01
 Dean Halverson (LB), Washington . . . . 1970
 Conrad Hamilton (CB), East. New Mexico . . . . 2001
 Ruffin Hamilton (LB), Tulane . . . . 1997–99
 Dave Hampton (RB), Wyoming . . . . 1972–75
 Don Hansen (LB), Illinois . . . . 1969–75
 Byron Hanspard (RB), Texas Tech . . . . 1997–99
 Tom Harmon (G), Gus, Adolphus . . . . 1967
 John Harper (LB), So I—Illinois . . . . 1983
 Roger Harper (S), Ohio St. . . . . 1993–95
 Joey Harrington (QB), Oregon . . . . 2007
 Antoine Harris (S), Louisville . . . . 2007-09
 Bill Harris (RB), Colorado . . . . 1968
 Josh Harris (LS), Auburn . . . . 2012-14
 Leonard Harris (WR), Texas Tech . . . . 1994
 Ronnie Harris (WR), Oregon . . . . 1998–99
 Roy Harris (DT), Florida . . . . 1984–85
 Dennis Harrison (DE), Vanderbilt . . . . 1986–87
 Leo Hart (QB), Duke . . . . 1971
 Ben Hartsock (TE), Ohio State . . . . 2008
 Edgerton Hartwell (LB), Western Illinois . . . . 2005–06
 Steven Hauschka (K), North Carolina St. . .
 Rodney Hall (OG), Kentucky . . 2009
 Dennis Havig (G), Colorado . . . . 1972–75
 Alex Hawkins (WR), South Carolina . . . . 1966–67
 Joe Hawley (C), UNLV . . . . 2010-14
 Steve Haworth (DB), Oklahoma . . . . 1983–84
 Kelvin Hayden (CB), Illinois . . . . 2011
 Mercury Hayes (WR), Michigan . . . . 1997
 Tom Hayes (CB), San Diego St. . . . . 1971–75
 Michael Haynes (WR), N Arizona . . . . 1988–93, ‘97
 Verron Haynes (FB), Georgia . . . . 2009
 Ronnie Heard (S), Mississippi . . . . 2005
 Rodney Heath (CB), Minnesota . . . . 2002
 Bobby Hebert (QB), NW Louisiana . . . . 1993–96
 Ralph Heck (LB), Colorado . . . . 1966–68
 Ricky Heimuli (DT), Oregon . . . . 2014
 Ron Heller (TE), Oregon St. . . . . 1989
 Chuck Herman (G), Arkansas . . . . 1980
 Steve Herndon (G), Georgia . . . . 2004
 Mack Herron (RB), Kansas St. . . . . 1975
 Devin Hester (WR), Miami . . . . 2014
 Jessie Hester (WR), FSU . . . . 1988
 Dave Hettema (T), New Mexico . . . . 1970
 Craig Heyward (RB), Pittsburgh . . . . 1994–96
 Alex Higdon (TE), Ohio State . . . . 1988
 Drew Hill (WR), Georgia Tech . . . . 1992–93
 Kahlil Hill (WR), Iowa . . . . 2002
 Tye Hill (CB), Clemson . . . . 2009
 Roy Hilton (DE), Jackson St. . . . . 1975
 Billy Hinson (G), Florida . . . . 1986
 Chris Hinton (T), Northwestern . . . . 1990–93
 Floyd Hodge (WR), Utah . . . . 1982–84
 John Holecek (LB), Illinois . . . . 2002
 Bob Holly (QB), Princeton . . . . 1984–85
 Lamar Holmes (T), Southern Miss. . . . . 2012-14
 Rudy Holmes (DE), Drake . . . . 1974
 Pierce Holt (DL), Angelo St. . . . . 1993–95
 Chris Hope (S), Florida St . . . . 2012
 Houston Hoover (T), Jackson State . . . . 1988–92
 Joe Horn (WR), Itawamba (JC) . . . . 2007
 Raymond House (DE), Arkansas . . . . 2003
 Chris Houston (CB), Arkansas . . . . 2007-09
 Harrison Houston (WR), Florida . . . . 1994
 Ed Howard (WR), Rice . . . . 1995
 Glen Howe (T), So Mississippi . . . . 1985–86
 Pat Howell (G), USC . . . . 1979–83
 Floyd Hudlow (CB/S), Arizona . . . . 1967–68
 Chris Hudson (S), Colorado . . . . 2001
 Ben Huff (DT), Michigan . . . . 1999
 Bob Hughes (DE), Jackson St. . . . . 1967–69
 Claude Humphrey (DE), Tenn. St . . . . 1968–74, 76–78
 John Hunter (T), BYU . . . . 1989–91
 Scott Hunter (QB), Alabama . . . . 1976–78
 Kevin Huntley (DE), Kansas State . . . . 2007
 Richard Huntley (RB), Winston-Salem . . . . 1996
 Tom Hutchinson (WR), Kentucky . . . . 1966

I

 David Irons (CB), Auburn . . . . 2007-08
 Kemal Ishmael (S) Central Florida . . . . 2013-14

J

 Eric Jack (CB), New Mexico . . . . 1994–95
 Alfred Jackson (WR), Texas . . . . 1978–84
 Chevis Jackson (CB), LSU . . . . 2008-09
 Ernie Jackson (CB), Duke . . . . 1978
 Grady Jackson (DT), Knoxville . . . . 2006-08
 Jeff Jackson (LB), Auburn . . . . 1984–85
 Larron Jackson (G), Missouri . . . . 1975–76
 Marlion Jackson (RB), Saginaw Valley St . . . 2006
 Robert Jackson (LB), Texas A&M . . . . 1982
 Steven Jackson (RB), Oregon St. . . . . 2013-14
 Tommy Jackson (DL), Auburn . . . . 2006
 Tyson Jackson Jackson, Tyson (DE), LSU . . . . 2014
 Willie Jackson (WR), Florida . . . . 2002
 John James (P), Florida . . . . 1972–81
 Robert James (LB), Arizona State  . . . . 2009-12
 Brandon Jamison (LB), West Georgia . . . . 2006
 Ray Jarvis (WR), Norfolk St. . . . . 1971–72
 Ed Jasper (DT), Texas A&M . . . . 1999–03
 Jason Jefferson (DT), Wisconsin . . . . 2008
 Shawn Jefferson (WR), Central Florida . . . . 2000–02
 Noel Jenke (LB), Minnesota . . . . 1972
 Alfred Jenkins (WR), Morris Brown . . . . 1975–83
 Michael Jenkins (WR), Ohio State . . . . 2004–10
 Adam Jennings (WR), Fresno State . . . . 2006-08
 Peria Jerry (DT), Mississippi . . . . 2009-13
 Travis Jervey (RB), The Citadel . . . . 2001–03
 Bill Jobko (LB), Ohio St. . . . . 1966
 Billy Johnson (WR), Widener . . . . 1982–87
 Darius Johnson (WR), SMU . . . . 2013
 Derrick Johnson (CB), Washington . . . . 2006
 D. J. Johnson (CB), Kentucky . . . . 1994–96
 Doug Johnson (QB), Florida . . . . 2000–03
 Ellis Johnson (DL), Florida . . . . 2002–03
 Eric Johnson (LB), Nebraska . . . . 2004
 Gartrell Johnson (RB), Colorado St. . . . . 2010
 Kenny Johnson (DB), Mississippi St. . . . . 1980–86
 Mike Johnson (OL), Alabama . . . . 2010-14
 Norm Johnson (K) UCLA . . . . 1991–94
 Randy Johnson (QB), Texas A&l . . . . 1966–70
 Rudy Johnson (RB), Nebraska . . . . 1966
 Thomas Johnson (DT), Middle Tenn. St. . . . . 2009
 Tracy Johnson (RB), Clemson . . . . 1990–91
 Undra Johnson (RB), W Virginia . . . . 1989
 Bob Jones (WR), San Diego St. . . . . 1969
 Bob Jones (DB), Virginia Union . . . . 1975–76
 Derrick Jones (DE), Grand Valley State . . . . 2007
 Earl Jones (DB), Norfolk St. . . . . 1980–83
 Henry Jones (S), Illinois . . . . 2002
 Jerry Jones (DT), Bowling Green . . . . 1966
 Joey Jones (WR), Alabama . . . . 1986
 Julio Jones (WR), Alabama . . . . 2011-14
 June Jones (QB), Portland St. . . . . 1977–79
 Keith Jones (RB), Illinois . . . . 1989–92
 Terren Jones (T), Alabama State . . . . 2013-14
 Tony Jones (WR), Texas . . . . 1992
 Antony Jordan (LB), Vanderbilt . . . . 2000–01
 Brian Jordan (S), Richmond . . . . 1989–91

K

 Dave Kadela (T), Virginia Tech . . . . 2001
 Danny Kanell (QB), Florida State . . . . 1999–00
 Rick Kay (LB), Colorado . . . . 1977
 Jeff Kelly (LB), Kansas State . . . . 1999–02
 Reggie Kelly (TE), Miss. State . . . . 1999–02, 2011
 Todd Kelly (DE), Tennessee . . . . 1996
 Vince Kendrick (RB), Florida . . . . 1974–75
 Mike Kenn (T), Michigan . . . . 1978–94
 Lincoln Kennedy (G/T), Washington . . . . 1993–95
 Patrick Kerney (DE), Virginia . . . . 1999–06
 Jeff Kiewel (G), Arizona . . . . . . . . . . . . . . . . 1985–87
 Todd Kinchen (WR), Louisiana State . . . . 1997–98
 Greg Kindle (G), Tennessee St. . . . . . . . . . . . .1976
 Austin King (C), Northwestern . . . . . . . . 2004–06
 Lou Kirouac (G/K), Boston College . . . . . 1966–67
 Kurt Kittner (QB), Illinois . . . . . 2002–03
 Perry Klein (QB), C.W. Post . . . . . 1994–95
 Leander Knight (CB), Montclair St. . . . . . 1988
 Matt Knutson Knutson, Matt (OL), North Dakota . . . . . 2003
 Michael Koenen (P), W. Washington . . . . . 2005–10
 Rich Koeper (T), Oregon State . . . . . 1966
 Jeff Komlo (QB), Delaware . . . . . 1982
 Peter Konz  (C/G), Wisconsin . . . . . 2012-14
 Brian Kozlowski (TE), Connecticut . . . . . 1997–03
 Erik Kramer (QB), N Carolina St. . . . . . 1987
 Rich Kraynak (LB), Pittsburgh . . . . . 1987
 Keith Krepfle (TE), Iowa St. . . . . . 1982
 Rudy Kuechenberg (LB), Indiana . . . . . 1971
 George Kunz (T), Notre Dame . . . . . 1969–74
 Jake Kupp (G), Washington . . . . . 1967
 Fulton Kuykendall (LB), UCLA . . . . . 1975–84

L

 Antwan Lake (DE), West Virginia . . . . 2004–05
 Ron Lamb (RB), South Carolina . . . . 1972
 Mike Landrum (TE), So Miss . . . . 1984
 Gene Lang (RB), LSU . . . . 1988–90
 Jim Laughlin (LB), Ohio St. . . . . 1980–82,87
 Chad Lavalais (DT), LSU . . . . 2004–05
 Al Lavan (S), Colorado St. U . . . . 1969–70
 Kent Lawrence (WR), Georgia . . . . 1970
 Rolland Lawrence (DB), Tabor . . . . 1973–80
 George Layne (FB), TCU . . . . 2001–03
 John Leake (LB), Florida . . . . 2005–06
 Harper LeBel (TE), Col St. . . . . 1991–96
 Monte Ledbetter (WR), NW Louisiana . . . . 1969
 Bob Lee (WR), Minnesota . . . . 1969
 Bob Lee (QB), Pacific . . . . 1973–74
 Danzell Lee (TE), Lamar . . . . 1988
 Dwight Lee (RB), Michigan St. . . . . 1968
 Ronnie Lee (OL), Baylor . . . . 1983
 Saeed Lee (CB), Alabama State . . . . 2013
 Byron Leftwich (QB), Marshall . . . . 2007
 Matt Lehr (G), Virginia Tech . . . . 2005–06
 Ashley Lelie (WR), Hawaii . . . . 2006
 Bruce Lemmerman (QB), Cal State-Northridge . . . . 1968–69
 Fred Lester (FB), Alabama A&M . . . . 1997
 Greg Lens (DT), Trinity Texas . . . . 1970–71
 Dave Levenick (LB), Wisconsin . . . . 1983–84
 John Lewis (WR), Oklahoma St. . . . . 2003
 Mike Lewis (DT), Arkansas AM&N . . . . 1971–79
 Trey Lewis (NT), Washburn . . . . 2007-10
 Errol Linden (T), Houston . . . . 1966–68
 Sean Locklear (T), NC State . . . . 2013
 Curtis Lofton (LB), Oklahoma . . . . 2008-11
 Ernie Logan (DE), East Carolina . . . . 1993
 Keith Loneker (G), Kansas . . . . 1996
 Bob Long (WR), Wichita State . . . . 1968
 Billy Lothridge (P/S), Georgia Tech . . . . 1966–71
 Calvin Loveall (CB), Idaho . . . . 1988
 Omare Lowe (S), Washington . . . . 2005–06
 Dwight Lowery Lowery, Dwight (S), San Jose St . . . . 2014
 Mick Luckhurst (K), California . . . . 1981–87
 Robert Lyles (LB), TCU . . . . 1990–91
 Mitch Lyons (TE), Michigan State . . . . 1993–96

M

 Jordan Mabin (CB), Northwestern . . . . 2014
 Ron Mabra (DB), Howard . . . . 1975–76
 Red Mack (WR), Notre Dame . . . . 1966
 Jesse Mahelona (DT), Tennessee . . . . 2007
 Rydell Malancon (LB), Louisiana State . . . . 1984
 Josh Mallard (DE), Georgia . . . . 2006-07
 John Mallory (S), West Virginia . . . . 1967
 Art Malone (RB), Arizona State . . . . 1970–74
 Jim Mankins (RB), Florida State . . . . 1967
 Phillipkeith Manley (G), Toledo . . . . 2012
 Rosie Manning (T), NE Oklahoma . . . . 1972–75
 Stansly Maponga (DE), TCU . . . . 2013-14
 Frank Marchlewski (C), Minnesota . . . . 1966–68
 Bud Marshall (DT), Stephen F Austin . . . . 1966  
 Randy Marshall (DE), Linfield . . . . 1970–71
 Whit Marshall (LB), Georgia . . . . 1999
 Billy Martin (TE), Georgia Tech . . . . 1966–67
 Charles Martin (NT), Livingston . . . . 1988
 Tony Martin (WR), Mesa . . . . 1998, 2001
 Freddie Martino (WR), North Greenville . . . . 2014
 Greg Marx (DT), Notre Dame . . . . 1973
 Jonathan Massaquoi (DE), Troy . . . . 2012-14
 Kevin Mathis (CB), Texas A&M Commerce . . . . 02–04, 06
 Terance Mathis (WR), New Mexico . . . . 1994–01
 John Matlock (C), Miami . . . . 1970–71
 Allama Matthews (TE), Vanderbilt . . . . 1983–85
 Aubrey Matthews (WR), Delta State . . . . 1986–88
 Clay Matthews, Jr. (LB), Southern Cal . . . . 1994–96
 Cliff Matthews (DE), South Carolina . . . . 2011-14
 Henry Matthews (RB), Michigan St . . . . 1973
 Jake Matthews (T), Texas A&M . . . . 2014
 Andy Maurer (G), Oregon . . . . 1970–73
 Brett Maxie (S), Texas Southern . . . . 1994
 James Mayberry (RB), Colorado . . . . 1979–81
 Tim Mazzetti (K), Pennsylvania . . . . 1978–80
 Tod McBride (CB), UCLA . . . . 2003
 Gerald McBurrows (S), Kansas . . . . 1999–03
 Kevin McCadam (S), Virginia Tech . . . . 2002–05
 Brendan McCarthy (RB), Boston Col . . . . 1968
 Ron McCartney (LB), Tennessee . . . . 1977–79
 Tom McCauley (S/WR), Wisconsin . . . . 1969–71
 Dewey McClain (LB), E Central Univ . . . . 1976–80
 Robert McClain (CB), Connecticut . . . . 2012-14
 Todd McClure (C), LSU . . . . 1999–12
 Quentin McCord (WR), Kentucky . . . . 2001–03
 Luke McCown (QB), Louisiana Tech . . . . 2012
 Fred McCrary (FB), Mississippi St . . . . 2004–06
 Greg McCrary (TE), Clark . . . . 1975–77
 Pellom McDaniels (DE), Oregon State . . . . 1999–00
 Gary McDermott (RB), Tulsa . . . . 1969
 Tommy McDonald (WR), Oklahoma . . . . 1967
 Paul McFadden (K), Youngstown State . . . . 1989
 Molly McGee (RB), Rhode Island . . . . 1974
 Lenny McGill (CB), Arizona State . . . . 1996–97
 Reggie McGrew (DT), Florida . . . . 2002
 Hugh Mclnnis (TE), So Mississippi . . . . 1966
 Corey McIntyre (FB), West Virginia . . . . 2007
 Secedrick Mclntyre (RB), Auburn . . . . 1977
 Phil McKinnely (T), UCLA . . . . 1976–80
 Tim McKyer (CB), Tex–Arlington . . . . 1991–92, ‘96
 Steve McMillon (CB) Wyoming . . . . 1989
 Kim McQuilken (QB), Lehigh . . . . 1974–77
 Kerry Meier (WR), Kansas . . . . 2010-12
 Jeff Merrow (DE), W Virginia . . . . 1975–83
 Eric Metcalf (WR/RB), Texas . . . . 1995–96
 Eddie Meyers (RB), Navy . . . . 1982
 Larry Mialik (TE), Wisconsin . . . . 1972–74
 Rich Miano (S), Hawaii . . . . 1995
 Ron Middleton (TE), Auburn . . . . 1986–87
 Nick Mike–Mayer (K), Temple . . . . 1973–77
 Russ Mikeska (TE), Texas A&M . . . . 1979–83
 Hugh Millen (QB), Washington . . . . 1988–90
 Brandon Miller (DE), Georgia . . . . 2008
 Brett Miller (OT), Iowa . . . . 1983–88
 Chris Miller (QB), Oregon . . . . 1987–92
 Jim Miller (QB), Michigan State . . . . 1997
 Jim Miller (G) Iowa . . . . 1971–72,74
 Junior Miller (TE), Nebraska . . . . 1980–83
 Kyle Miller (TE), Mount Union . . . . 2014
 Nate Miller (OL), Louisiana State . . . . 1995–97
 James Milling (WR), Maryland . . . . 1991–92
 Shawn Mills (WR), Southern Miss . . . . 2001
 Lawyer Milloy (S), Washington . . . . 2006-08
 Martrez Milner (TE), Georgia . . . . 2007-08
 David Mims (WR), Baylor . . . . 1993–94
 Barry Mitchell (DE), Idaho . . . . 1997
 Brian Mitchell (CB), BYU . . . . 1991–92
 Charles Mitchell (S), Mississippi St . . . . 2012
 Ken Mitchell (LB), UNLV . . . . 1973–74
 Jim Mitchell (TE), Prairie View . . . . 1969–79
 Leonard Mitchell (T), Houston . . . . 1987
 Roland Mitchell (CB), Texas Tech . . . . 1990
 Chris Mohr (P), Alabama . . . . 2001–04
 Rod Monroe (TE), Cincinnati . . . . 1998–99
 Alton Montgomery (S), Houston . . . . 1993–95
 Marv Montgomery (T), USC . . . . 1978
 Michael Moore (G), Troy State . . . . 2003
 Robert Moore (S), Northwestern St . . . . 1986–89
 Ron Moore (DT), Northwest. Okla. St . . . . 2001
 Tom Moore (RB), Vanderbilt . . . . 1967
 William Moore (S), Missouri . . . . 2009-14
 Kindal Moorehead (DT), Alabama . . . . 2008
 Dwayne Morgan (OL), Clemson . . . . 2003
 Tom Moriarty (S), Bowling Green . . . . 1977–79,81
 Mike Moroski (QB), Cal–Davis . . . . 1979–84 
 Larry Morris (LB), Georgia Tech . . . . 1966
 Christian Morton (CB), Illinois . . . . 2004–05
 Zeke Motta (S), Notre Dame . . . . 2013
 Mark Mraz (DE), Utah State . . . . 1987
 Ovie Mughelli (FB), Wake Forest . . . . 2007-11
 Neal Musser (LB), NC State . . . . 1981–83

N

 Browning Nagle (QB), Louisville . . . . 1995–96
 Louis Neal (WR), Prairie View . . . . 1973–74
 Dallas Neil (TE), Montana . . . . 2000, 02
 Keith Newman (LB), North Carolina . . . . 2003
 Cam Newton (S), Furman . . . . 2005–06
 Stephen Nicholas (LB), South Florida . . . . 2007-13
 Adam Nissley (TE), UCF . . . . 2012-13
 Tommy Nobis (LB), Texas . . . . 1966–76
 Terry Nofsinger (QB), Utah . . . . 1967
 Jim Norton (DT/DE), Washington . . . . 1967–68
 Jerious Norwood (RB), Mississippi . . . . 2006-10
 Ralph Norwood (OT), LSU . . . . 1989

O

 Nate Odomes (CB), Wisconsin . . . . 1996
 Ray Ogden (TE), Alabama . . . . 1967–68
 Quinn Ojinnaka (T), Syracuse . . . . 2006-09
 Winslow Oliver (RB), New Mexico . . . . 1999–00
 Frank Omiyale (T), Tennessee Tech . . . . 2006
 Matt O'Neal (C), Oklahoma . . . . 2000
 Ralph Ortega (LB), Florida . . . . 1975–78
 Paul Oswald (G), Kansas . . . . 1988
 Will Overstreet (LB), Tennessee . . . . 2002–03
 Chris Owens (CB) San Jose State . . . . 2009-12
 Dan Owens (DT), Southern California . . . . 1996–97
 Ken Oxendine (RB), Virginia Tech . . . . 1998–99

P

 Jeff Pahukoa (G/T), Washington . . . . . . . 1995–96
 Dick Palmer (LB), Kentucky . . . . . . . . . . . . . . . . 1974
 Michael Palmer (TE), Clemson . . . . . . . . . . 2010-12
 Bear Pascoe Pascoe, Bear (TE), Fresno St. . . . . . . . . . . . . . . . 2014
 Greg Paterra (RB), Slippery Rock . . . . . . . . . . . 1989
 Jerome Pathon (WR), Washington . . . . . . . . . 2005
 Ricky Patton (RB), Jackson St. . . . . . . . . . . . . . . 1978
 Jeff Paulk (FB), Arizona St. . . . . . . . . . . . . . . . . . 1999
 Dennis Pearson (WR), San Diego St. . . . . 1978–79
 Justin Peelle (TE), Oregon . . . . . . . . . . . . . 2008-10
 Joe Pellegrini (C), Harvard . . . . . . . . . . . . . 1984–86
 Erric Pegram (RB), N Tex St. . . . . . . . . . . . . 1991–94
 Terrance Pennington (OT), New Mexico . . . . 2007
 Robert Pennywell (LB), Grambling . . . . . . 1977–80
 Charlie Peprah (S), Alabama . . . . . . . . . . . . . . 2009
 Mike Perko (DT), Utah St. . . . . . . . . . . . . . . . . . 1982
 Corey Peters (DT), Kentucky . . . . 2010-14
 Mike Peterson (LB), Florida . . . . 2009-12
 Todd Peterson (K), Georgia . . . . 2005
 Anthony Phillips (CB), Tex. A&M-Kingsville . . . . 1994–96
 Jason Phillips (WR) Houston . . . . 1991–93
 Ray Phillips (LB), North Carolina St. . . . . 1986
 Mareno Philyaw (WR), Troy State . . . . 2000–01
 Bruce Pickens (CB), Nebraska . . . . 1992
 Evan Pilgrim (G/C), BYU . . . . 1999–00
 Lawrence Pillers (DT), Alcorn State . . . . 1985
 Artose Pinner (RB), Kentucky . . . . 2007
 Bryan Pittman (LS), Washington . . . . 2009
 Mike Pitts (DE), Alabama . . . . 1983–86
 Anthony Pleasant (DE), Tennessee St. . . . . 1997
 Reggie Pleasant (DB), Clemson . . . . 1985
 Tony Plummer (S), Pacific . . . . 1971–73
 Ray Poage (TE), Texas . . . . 1971
 Marcus Pollard (TE), Bradley . . . . 2008
 Jose Portilla (T), Arizona . . . . 1998–99
 Carlton Powell (DT), Virginia Tech . . . . 2011
 Matt Prater (K), Central Florida . . . . 2007
 Roell Preston (WR), Mississippi . . . . 1995–96
 Peerless Price (WR), Tennessee . . . . 2003–04
 Tom Pridemore (S), West Virginia . . . . 1978–85
 James Primus (RB), UCLA . . . . 1988–89
 Mike Pringle (RB), Cal State–Fullerton . . . . 1990
 Mike Pritchard (WR), Colorado . . . . 1992–93
 Billy Ray Pritchett (RB), W. Texas St . . . . 1976–77
 Stanley Pritchett (FB), South Carolina . . . . 2004
 Wes Pritchett (LB), Notre Dame . . . . 1991
 Joe Profit (RB), NE Louisiana . . . . 1971–73
 Andrew Provence (DT), S Carolina . . . . 1983–87
 Etric Pruitt (S), Southern Miss . . . . 2004

Q
 Kurt Quarterman (OL), Louisville . . . . 2007

R

 Derek Rackley (TE), Minnesota . . . . 2000–05
 John Rade (LB), Boise St . . . . 1983–92
 Jason Rader (TE), Marshall . . . . 2008-09
 Wayne Radloff (C), Georgia . . . . 1986–89
 Nick Rassas (S), Notre Dame . . . . 1966–68
 Eddie Ray (RB), LSU . . . . 1972–74
 Terry Ray (S), Oklahoma . . . . 1992
 Ken Reaves (CB), Norfolk St . . . . 1966–73
 Ron Rector (RB), Northwestern . . . . 1966–67
 Reggie Redding (T), Cal St. Ful . . . . 1991
 Chris Redman (QB), Louisville . . . . 2007-11
 Anthony Redmon (G), Auburn . . . . 2000
 Rudy Redmond (CB), Pacific . . . . 1969–71
 Frank Reed (DB), Washington . . . . 1976–80
 Oscar Reed (RB), Colorado State . . . . 1975
 Bernard Reedy (WR), Toledo . . . . 2014
 Ike Reese (LB), Michigan State . . . . 2005–06
 Michael Reid (LB), Wisconsin . . . . 1987–92
 Guy Reese (DT), SMU . . . . 1966
 Sean Renfree (QB), Duke . . . . 2013-14
 Gilbert Renfroe (QB), Tenn St . . . . 1990
 Adam Replogle (G), Indiana . . . . 2013-14
 Garrett Reynolds (OT), North Carolina . . . . 2009-13
 Bobby Richards (DE), LSU . . . . 1966–67
 Dave Richards (G), UCLA . . . . 1994–96
 Al Richardson (LB), Georgia Tech . . . . 1980–85
 Jerry Richardson (CB/S), W Texas St . . . . 1966–67
 Wally Richardson (QB), Penn St . . . . 1999
 Louis Riddick (S), Pittsburgh . . . . 1992, ‘96
 Preston Ridlehuber (RB), Georgia . . . . 1966
 Bob Riggle (S), Penn State . . . . 1966–67
 Gerald Riggs (RB), Arizona St . . . . 1982–88
 Karon Riley (LB), Minnesota . . . . 2002–04
 Andre Rison (WR), Mich St . . . . 1990–94
 Jim Ritcher (G), North Carolina St . . . .1994–95
 Ron Rivers (RB), Fresno State . . . . 2000
 Gary Roberts (G), Purdue . . . . 1970
 George Roberts (P), Virginia Tech . . . . 1982
 Guy Roberts (LB), Maryland . . . . 1976
 Jamal Robertson (RB), Ohio Northern . . . . 2006
 Travian Robertson (DT), South Carolina . . . . 2012-13
 Bo Robinson (RB), W Texas St . . . . 1981–83
 Dunta Robinson (CB), South Carolina . . . . 2010-12
 Eugene Robinson (S), Colgate . . . . 1998–99
 Laurent Robinson (WR), Illinois State . . . . 2007-08
 Tommy Robison (G), Texas A&M . . . . 1989
 Travaris Robinson (S), Auburn . . . . 2003
 Jacquizz Rodgers (RB), Oregon St . . . . 2011-14
 Doug Rogers (DE), Stanford . . . . 1982
 Joe Rogers (WR), Texas Southern . . . . 1994
 Sam Rogers (LB), Colorado . . . . 2002–03
 Brett Romberg (C), Miami (Fla.) . . . . 2009, 2011
 Burnell Roques (WR), Claremont . . . . 1996
 Derek Ross (CB), Ohio State . . . . 2003
 Kevin Ross (CB), Temple . . . . 1994–95
 Allen Rossum (PR/KR/CB), Notre Dame . . . . 2002–06
 Mike Rozier (RB), Nebraska . . . . 1990–91
 Karl Rubke (DT), USC . . . . 1966–67
 Mike Ruether (C), Texas . . . . 1990–93
 Marion Rushing (LB), So Illinois . . . . 1966–68
 Carl Russ (LB), Michigan . . . . 1975
 Twan Russell (LB), Miami . . . . 2003
 Matt Ryan (QB), Boston College . . . . 2008-14
 Billy Ryckman (WR), Louisiana Tech . . . . 1977–79
 Paul Ryczek (C), Virginia . . . . 1974–79

S

 Bill Sabatino (DT), Colorado . . . . 1969
 Troy Sadowski (TE), Georgia . . . . 1990
 Michael Saffer (OL), UCLA . . . . 2003
 Ephraim Salaam (T), San Diego St . . . . 1998–01
 Asante Samuel (CB), UCF . . . . 2012-13
 Bill Sandeman (T), Pacific . . . . 1967–73
 Bob Sanders (LB), N Texas St . . . . 1967
 Deion Sanders (CB), Florida St . . . . 1989–93
 Eric Sanders (T), Nevada–Reno . . . . 1981–86
 James Sanders (S), Fresno State . . . . 2011
 Lewis Sanders (CB), Maryland . . . . 2007
 Ricky Sanders (WR), SW Texas St . . . . 1994–95
 O.J. Santiago (TE), Kent State . . . . 1997–99
 Craig Sauer (LB), Minnesota . . . . 1996–99
 Brian Saxton (TE), Boston College . . . . 1997
 Charlie Scales (RB), Indiana . . . . 1966
 Roy Schmidt (G/T), Long Beach St . . . . 1969
 Matt Schaub (QB), Virginia . . . . 2004–06
 Shann Schillinger (S), Montana . . . . 2010-12
 Mike Schneck (LS), Wisconsin . . . . 2007-09
 Turk Schonert (QB), Stanford . . . . 1986
 Ryan Schraeder (T), Valdosta St . . . . 2013-14
 Adam Schreiber (C/G), Texas . . . . 1997–99
 Lance Schulter (S), Hofstra  . . . . 2006
 Bryan Scott (S), Penn State . . . . 2003–05
 Dave Scott (T), Kansas . . . . 1976–82
 Freddie Scott (WR), Penn State . . . . 1996
 Jonathan Scott (T), Texas . . . . 2014
 John Scully (C), Notre Dame . . . . 1981–90
 Virgil Seay (WR), Troy St . . . . 1984
 John Settle (RB), Appalachian . . . . 1987–90
 Siddeeq Shabazz (S), New Mexico State . . . . 2003–04
 Kevin Shaffer (T), Tulsa . . . . 2002–05
 Dan Sharp (TE), Texas Christian . . . . 1987
 Glenn Sharpe (CB), Miami (Fla.) . . . . 2008
 Jerry Shay (DT), Purdue . . . . 1968–69
 Larry Shears (CB), Lincoln, Mo . . . . 1971
 Elbert Shelley (S), Arkansas State . . . . 1987–96
 Prince Shembo (LB), Notre Dame . . . . 2014
 Bob Sherlag (WR), Memphis St . . . . 1966
 Dick Shiner (QB), Maryland . . . . 1971–73
 Wes Shivers (T), Mississippi St . . . . 2000
 D.J. Shockley (QB), Georgia . . . . 2006-08
 Darrell Shropshire (DT), South Carolina . . . . 2005–06
 Lawrence Sidbury (DE), Richmond . . . . 2009-12
 Jimmy Sidle (TE/RB), Auburn . . . . 1966
 Chuck Sieminski (DT), Penn State . . . . 1966–67
 Carl Silvestri (CB–S), Wisconsin . . . . 1966
 Mike Simeta (DT), Kansas St . . . . 1983
 Mark Simoneau (LB), Kansas St . . . . 2000–02
 Jerry Simmons (WR), Bethune–Cookman.1967–69
 Jim Simon (G/T), Miami . . . . 1966–68
 Joe Sims (T), Nebraska . . . . 1991
 Steve Sloan (QB), Alabama . . . . 1966–67
 Gerald Small (CB), San Jose St . . . . 1984
 John Small (DT), Citadel . . . . 1970–72
 Dave Smigelsky (P), Virginia Tech . . . . 1982
 Antone Smith (RB), Florida State . . . . 2010-14
 Brady Smith (DE), Colorado St . . . . 2000–05
 Chuck Smith (DE), Tennessee . . . . 1992–99
 Don Smith (DE), Miami . . . . 1979–84
 Ed Smith (TE), no college . . . . 1997–98
 Jacques Smith (LB), Tennessee . . . . 2014
 Jerome Smith (RB), Syracuse . . . . 2014
 Maurice Smith (RB), North Car. A&T . . . . 2000–02
 Mike Smith (WR), Grambling . . . . 1980
 Ralph Smith (TE), Mississippi . . . . 1969
 Reggie Smith (WR), NC Central . . . . 1980–81
 Ron Smith (CB/WR), Wisconsin . . . . 1966–67
 Royce Smith (G), Georgia . . . . 1974–76
 Tony Smith (RB), Southern Miss . . . . 1992–94
 Vinson Smith (LB), E Carolina . . . . 1988
 Jason Snelling (RB), Virginia . . . . 2007-13
 Malcolm Snider (G), Stanford . . . . 1969–71
 Todd Snyder (WR), Ohio U . . . . 1970–72
 Phil Sobocinski (C), Wisconsin . . . . 1968
 Paul Soliai (DT) Utah . . . . 2014
 Jesse Solomon (LB), Florida St . . . . 1992
 Dezmen Southward (S), Wisconsin . . . . 2014
 Darryl Spencer (WR), Miami–Fla . . . . 1994–95
 Phil Spiller (S), Cal State–LA . . . . 1968
 Andy Spiva (LB), Tennessee . . . . 1977
 Mike Spivey (CB), Colorado . . . . 1982
 Marquis Spruill (LB), Syracuse . . . . 2014
 Sylvester Stamps (WR), Jackson St . . . . 1984–88
 Haskel Stanback (RB), Tennessee . . . . 1974–79
 Jeff Stanciel (RB), Miss Valley . . . . 1969
 Montavious Stanley (DT), Louisville . . . . 2007
 Tyler Starr (LB), South Dakota . . . . 2014
 Aaron Stecker (RB), Western Illinois . . . . 2009
 Fred Steinfort (PK), Boston College . . . . 1977–78
 Alex Stepanovich (C), Ohio State . . . . 2008
 Matt Stewart (LB), Vanderbilt . . . . 2001–04
 Steve Stewart (LB), Minnesota . . . . 1978
 Bryan Still (WR), Virginia Tech . . . . 1999
 Lemuel Stinson (CB), Texas Tech . . . . 1993
 Barry Stokes (T), Eastern Michigan . . . . 2005
 Daren Stone (S), Maine . . . . 2007
 James Stone (C), Tennessee . . . . 2014
 Art Strahan (DT), Texas Southern . . . . 1968
 Ray Strong (RB), Nevada/Las Vegas . . . . 1978–82
 Nate Stupar (LB), Penn St . . . . 2014
 Boone Stutz (TE/LS) Texas A&M . . . . 2006-07
 Dan Stryzinski (P), Indiana . . . . 1995–00
 Lorenzo Styles (LB), Ohio State . . . . 1995–96
 Larry Suchy (CB), Mississippi College . . . . 1968
 Jim Sullivan (DE), Lincoln, MO . . . . 1970
 Pat Sullivan (QB), Auburn . . . . 1972–75
 Eddie Sutter (LB), Northwestern . . . . 1997
 Will Svitek (OT), Stanford . . . . 2009-12
 Shawn Swayda (DE), Arizona State . . . . 1998–01
 Joe Szczecko (DT), Northwestern . . . . 1966–68
 Andrew Szczerba (TE), Boise State . . . . 2013

T

 Don Talbert (T), Texas . . . . 1966–68
 Ben Talley (LB), Tennessee . . . . 1998
 Darryl Talley (LB), West Virginia . . . . 1995
 Rodney Tate (RB), Texas . . . . 1984
 Henry Taylor (DT), South Carolina . . . . 2000
 Johnnie Taylor (LB), Hawaii . . . . 1984–86
 Malcolm Taylor (DE), Tennessee St. . . . . 1989
 Terry Taylor (CB), Southern Illinois . . . . 1995
 Tony Taylor (LB), Georgia . . . . 2007
 Matthew Teague (DE), Prairie View . . . . 1981
 Garth TenNapel (LB), Texas A&M . . . . 1978
 Galand Thaxton (LB), Wyoming . . . . 1989
 Keith Thibodeaux (CB), N.W. Louisiana . . . . 1999
 R. C. Thielemann (G), Arkansas . . . . 1977–84
 John Thierry (LB), Alcorn St. . . . . 2002
 Ben Thomas (DE), Auburn . . . . 1989
 Chuck Thomas (G), Oklahoma . . . . 1985
 George Thomas (WR), Nev.–Las Vegas . . . . 1989–92
 Rodney Thomas (RB), Texas A&M . . . . 2001
 Sean Thomas (DB), TCU . . . . 1985
 Michael Thompson (T), Tennessee St . . . . 2000–02
 Scott Thompson (DT), Citadel . . . . 1988
 Woody Thompson (RB), Miami . . . . 1975–77
 Kevin Thornal (WR), S. Methodist . . . . 1997
 Mike Tilleman (DT), Montana . . . . 1973–76
 Gerald Tinker (WR), Kent State . . . . 1974–75
 Ken Tippins (LB), MTSU . . . . 1990–95
 Robbie Tobeck (C), Washington St. . . . . 1993–99
 Jerry Togiai (DL), Kansas St. . . . . 2002
 Levine Toilolo (TE), Stanford . . . . 2013-14
 Tommy Tolleson (WR), Alabama . . . . 1966
 Billy Joe Tolliver (QB), Texas Tech . . . . 1991–93, ‘96–97
 David Toloumu (RB), Hawaii . . . . 1982
 Tim Toone (WR), Weber State . . . . 2012
 Leigh Torrence (CB), Stanford . . . . 2005
 Wade Traynham (K), Frederick . . . . 1966–67
 Jeremy Trueblood (T), Boston College . . . . 2013
 Desmond Trufant (CB), Washington . . . . 2013-14
 Esera Tuaolo (DT), Oregon State . . . . 1998
 Jessie Tuggle (LB), Valdosta State . . . . 1987–00
 Nick Turnbull (DS), Florida International . . . . 2006
 Jimmy Turner (CB), UCLA . . . . 1986–87
 Michael Turner (RB), Northern Illinois . . . . 2008-12
 Tom Tutson (DB), SC State . . . . 1983
 Perry Tuttle (WR), Clemson . . . . 1984
 Scott Tyner (P), Oklahoma State . . . . 1994
 Tim Tyrrell (RB), No. Illinois . . . . 1984–86

U

 Artie Ulmer (LB), Valdosta State . . . . . . . 2001–05
 Osi Umenyiora (DE), Troy State . . . . . . . . . 2013-14

V

 Jeff Van Note (C), Kentucky . . . . 1969–86
 Josh Vaughan (RB), Richmond . . . . 2013
 Darrick Vaughn (CB/Ret), Southwest Tex . . . . 2000–01
 Khaleed Vaughn (DE), Clemson . . . . 2004
 Demetrin Veal (DT) . . . . 2003
 Joe Vellano (DT) . . . . 2016–present
 Clarence Verdin (KR), SW Louisiana . . . . 1994
 Michael Vick (QB), Virginia Tech . . . . 2001–06
 Tony Vinson (RB), Towson State . . . . 1995
 Ken Vinyard (K), Texas Tech . . . . 1970

W

 Harmon Wages (RB), Florida . . . . 1968–71,73
 Danny Wagoner (DB), Kansas . . . . 1985
 Chuck Walker (DT), Duke . . . . 1972–75
 Cleo Walker (LB), Louisville . . . . 1971
 Darnell Walker (CB), Oklahoma . . . . 1993–96
 Vance Walker (DT), Georgia Tech . . . . 2009-12
 Anthony Wallace (RB), California . . . . 1993
 Darrin Walls (CB), Notre Dame . . . . 2011
 Lonnie Warwick (LB), Tenn Tech . . . . 1973–74
 Charles Washington (S), Cameron . . . . 1992–94
 Joe Washington (RB), Oklahoma . . . . 1985
 Joe Washington (RB), Illinois St . . . . 1973
 Ronnie Washington (LB), NE Louisiana St . . . . 1985
 Jim Waskiewicz (C), Wichita St . . . . 1969
 Ryan Watson (DL), Appalchian St . . . . 2002
 Fred Weary (CB), Florida . . . . 2002
 Jim Weatherford (S), Tennessee . . . . 1969
 Sean Weatherspoon (LB), Missouri . . . . 2010-14
 Jim Weatherley (C), None . . . . 1976
 Jason Webster (CB), Texas A&M . . . . 2004–06
 Eric Weems (WR), Bethune-Cookman . . . . 2007–11,14
 Todd Weiner (T), Kansas St . . . . 2002–08
 Ed West (TE), Auburn . . . . 1997
 Ernie Wheelwright (RB), So. Illinois . . . . 1966–67
 Ken Whisenhunt (TE), Georgia Tech . . . . 1985–88
 Chris White (DE), Southern . . . . 2000
 Dez White (WR), Georgia Tech . . . . 2004–05
 Lyman White (LB), LSU . . . . 1981–82
 Roddy White (WR), UAB . . . . 2005–14
 William White (S), Ohio State . . . . 1997–98
 Bob Whitfield (OT), Stanford . . . . 1992–03
 Bob Whitlow (C), Arizona . . . . 1966
 Dave Widell (G), Boston College . . . . 1998
 Chuck Wiley (DE), LSU . . . . 2000–01
 Ben Wilkerson (C), LSU . . . . 2007-08
 Reggie Wilkes (LB), Georgia Tech . . . . 1986–87
 Gary Wilkins (TE), Georgia Tech . . . . 1988–91
 Marcus Wilkins (LB), Texas . . . . 2007
 Brandon Williams (CB), Michigan . . . . 2003
 Brian Williams (CB), North Carolina State . . . . 2009-10
 Clay Williams (T), Indiana . . . . 1996
 Demorrio Williams (LB), Nebraska . . . . 2004–07
 Elijah Williams (CB), Florida . . . . 1998–01
 Gene Williams (G/T), Iowa State . . . . 1996–99
 Jimmy Williams (CB), Virginia Tech . . . . 2006-07
 Joel Williams (LB), Wis/LaCrosse . . . . 1979–82, 86–89
 Keith Williams (RB), SW Missouri . . . . 1986
 Richard Williams (RB) Memphis St . . . . 1983
 Sam Williams (DE), Michigan State . . . . 1966–67
 Thomas Williams (DE), Wyoming . . . . 1994
 Travis Williams (LB), Auburn . . . . 2007
 Tyrone Williams (CB), Nebraska . . . . 2003
 Matt Willig (T/G), Southern California . . . . 1996–97
 Mitch Willis (DT), SMU . . . . 1988
 Brenard Wilson (S), Vanderbilt . . . . 1987
 Jim Wilson (C), Georgia . . . . 1967
 John Parker Wilson (QB), Alabama . . . . 2009-10
 Wade Wilson (QB), East Texas St . . . . 1992
 Marcus Wimberly (S), Miami . . . . 1997
 Bill Windauer (DT), Iowa . . . . 1976
 Ronnie Wingo (RB), Arkansas . . . . 2014
 Randy Winkler (G), Tarleton St . . . . 1968
 Coy Wire (LB), Stanford . . . . 2008-10
 Scott Woerner (S), Georgia . . . . 1981
 Bill Wolski (RB), Notre Dame . . . . 1966
 Bo Wood (DE), North Carolina . . . . 1967
 Dennis Woodberry (CB), S. Arkansas . . . . 1986
 Paul Worrilow (LB), Delaware . . . . 2013-14
 James Wright (TE), Texas Christian . . . . 1978–79
 John Wright (WR), Illinois . . . . 1968
 Nate Wright (S), San Diego St . . . . 1969

Y

 George Yarno (C/G), Wash St . . . . 1988
 T. J. Yates (QB), North Carolina . . . . 2014
 Jeff Yeates (DT), Boston College . . . . 1976–84
 Ben Young (TE), UT–Arlington . . . . 1983
 Kevin Youngblood (WR), Clemson . . . . 2006

Z

 Tony Zackery (DB), Washington . . . . 1989
 Mike Zandofsky (G), Washington . . . . 1994–96
 Mike Zele (DT), Kent . . . . 1979–83
 Joe Zelenka (LS), Wake Forest . . . . 2009-11
 Jeff Zgonina (DT), Purdue . . . . 1996
 Keith Zinger (TE), LSU . . . . 2009
 John Zook (DE), Kansas . . . . 1969–75

References

Atl
Players